Eastmatt Supermarkets, often referred to simply as Eastmatt, is a supermarket chain in Kenya, the largest economy in the East African Community.

Location
The head office of Eastmatt Supermarkets is located in Mau Narok, a small town in Nakuru County in Kenya.

Overview
The supermarket chain owns and operates supermarkets in Kenya. Eastmatt is one of the smaller supermarket chains in the country, behind the major supermarket chains, including Nakumatt, Uchumi, Tuskys, Ukwala and Naivas.

Branches
 the supermarket chain maintains a total of nine branches at the following locations:  The supermarket chain does not have any branches outside of Kenya.

 Mau Narok Branch - Mau Narok
 Tala Branch - Tala
 Mwea Branch - Mwea
 Kitengela Branch - Kitengela
 Eastleigh Branch - Eastleigh Section III, Nairobi
 Mfangano Street Branch - Mfangano Street, Nairobi
 River Road Branch - River Road, Nairobi
 Tom Mboya Street Branch - Tom Mboya Road, Nairobi
 Kajiado Branch - Kajiado

Ownership
Eastmatt a wholly Kenyan, privately held company. The detailed shareholding in the stock of the company is not widely, publicly known, as at May 2015.

Recent developments
The supermarket chain which started operations in 1990, in a small upcountry town, has since 2014, began an aggressive expansion push into the central business district of Nairobi, the largest city in Kenya, and the capital of that country. It locates its stores near stages for public transport, targeting the large number of working people who use public means to commute to work.

See also

References

External links
The Most Popular Supermarkets In Nairobi, Kenya
Eastleigh Supermarket Sues To Stop Audit of Staff Records

Supermarkets of Kenya
Kenyan companies established in 1990
Retail companies established in 1990